Mucin-17 is a protein that in humans is encoded by the MUC17 gene.

Membrane mucins, such as MUC17, function in epithelial cells to provide cytoprotection, maintain luminal structure, provide signal transduction, and confer antiadhesive properties upon cancer cells that lose their apical/basal polarization.[supplied by OMIM]

References

Further reading

17